Group B of the 2004 Fed Cup Europe/Africa Zone Group III was one of two pools in the Europe/Africa Zone Group III of the 2004 Fed Cup. Four teams competed in a round robin competition, with the top two teams and the bottom two teams proceeding to their respective sections of the play-offs: the top teams play for advancement to the Group II.

Malta vs. Tunisia

Kenya vs. Botswana

Malta vs. Botswana

Tunisia vs. Kenya

Malta vs. Kenya

Tunisia vs. Botswana

See also
Fed Cup structure

References

External links
 Fed Cup website

2004 Fed Cup Europe/Africa Zone